Michael Welland (1946 – October 2017) was a British petroleum geologist and expert on sand (an arenophile). His book Sand: a journey through science and the imagination, won the 2010 John Burroughs Medal.
Welland was a featured commentator in the documentary film "Sand Wars" (2013).

Welland was born in 1946, son of Dennis Welland, Professor of American Literature and later Pro Vice Chancellor of the University of Manchester. He was educated at Manchester Grammar School and Selwyn College, Cambridge.

When he appeared in 2010 on the BBC Radio 4 programme The Museum of Curiosity, his proposed donation to the imaginary museum was singing sand dunes.

Selected publications
The Desert: lands of lost borders (2015,)
Sand: a journey through science and the imagination (2009,; published in United States as Sand: the never-ending story)

References

External links
 Welland's personal website, continued by his child
 
 Includes "Look inside" facility to view preface, selected pages and images

British geologists
1946 births
2017 deaths
People educated at Manchester Grammar School
Alumni of Selwyn College, Cambridge